The Armed (often iconized as ⋈) are an American anonymous hardcore punk collective formed in Detroit, Michigan in 2009. They often feature guests including instrumentalists on their releases. These include Chris Pennie, Nick Yacyshyn, Ben Koller, and Urian Hackney. Converge guitarist Kurt Ballou has been involved in the recording and production of all their releases.

History

Formation and These Are Lights (2009) 
Most of the members of The Armed previously played in another band, Slicer Dicer, which, according to Tony Wolski, became The Armed.

The Armed released their debut album These Are Lights, mixed by Kurt Ballou, for free in 2009. Wolski explained the album's free release in an interview with Thrash Hits: "Wanting people to actually hear the music made us give it away for free. We’ve all played in other bands for a while now, and whether it is good or not, it is undeniable that for the most part young people do not place the same sense of monetary value on recordings as they once did. People can argue about the ethics, but that is the fact. So you might as well try to adapt to that and control the situation on your own terms. Why let someone posting a horribly compressed torrent of your material dictate what most people are going to hear? Releasing it on our own allowed us to exercise some level of quality control. Also, we’re able to reach a lot further this way…for example, I doubt you guys would’ve heard our album if we were just shelling out half a dozen CDs at shows back in the States. And people actually hearing this stuff is by far the most important goal."

EPs (2010–2013) 
The Armed released their first EP Common Enemies, which featured a guest performance by Chris Pennie, on 16 July 2010. The Armed released their second EP Young & Beautiful on 11 October 2011. The EP was mixed by Ballou and featured a guest performance by Pennie. The Armed released their third EP Spreading Joy on 11 December 2012; Pennie performed on all the songs on the EP. The Armed released a split EP with Tharsis They on 17 December 2013.

Untitled (2015–2016) 
The Armed released their second album Untitled on 23 June 2015. The Armed went to "great lengths" to disguise who worked on what aspect of the new record with the exception of guest drummer Nick Yacyshyn and engineer Kurt Ballou.

The Armed released their first live album Unanticipated on released 16 June 2016.

Only Love (2018–2020) 
On 27 April 2018 The Armed released Only Love, with Ben Koller providing drums. Koller explained in an interview with Modern Drummer that he was only sort of familiar with the band and knew they were "mysterious and total weirdos." Koller was informed by Ballou that the band was recording a new album and would love for Koller to track drums for it. Koller has said the request was short notice, and that the recording would take place right in the middle of tracking drums for a new Converge album, which seemed "[like it would be] pretty stressful." However, Koller heard that Rob Trujillo would be playing bass on the album, which was "the selling point" to him. In fact, Trujillo was never involved in any capacity with the album. Koller was also told by fellow Converge bandmate and Only Love's producer Kurt Ballou that the demos he was sent for this album were Converge songs, spurring him to learn them. Koller went on to say "...essentially, I was conned into playing on this album. I was so taken aback by these weird tactics that I just went with it."

The Armed contributed the song "Night City Aliens" to Cyberpunk 2077 under the pseudonym "Homeschool Dropouts".

Ultrapop (2021-present) 
In April 2021, The Armed released Ultrapop, their fourth full-length album. It received highly favourable reviews from critics, garnering "universal acclaim" according to review aggregator Metacritic; Paste Magazine gave it a rating of 8.6/10, and Pitchfork gave it 8.2/10.

Musical style 
The band have primarily been described as a hardcore punk, as well as metalcore, post-hardcore and experimental hardcore.

Members
The Armed has a central core of members while featuring a rotating line-up of collaborators. The band has stated that the line-up is "ever-changing." They have gone to lengths to misdirect, deceive, and toy with their audience when it comes to who is a member of the band. To achieve this, the band has avoided printing names of its members, had actors pretend to be members of the band and toured in secret, often performing at open mic nights under fake names. To promote their 2021 album Ultrapop, The Armed officially announced their lineup of the band for the first time but it is unknown whether or not the personnel listed are actually members of the band.

Known contributors
 Chris Pennie – drums on Spreading Joy (2012)
 Nick Yacyshyn – drums on Untitled (2015)
 Ben Koller – drums on Only Love (2018) and Ultrapop (2021)
 Urian Hackney - drums on Ultrapop (2021)
 Adam Vallely - guitar/vocals on Ultrapop (2021)
 Clark Huge - synthesizers on Ultrapop (2021)
 Dan Greene - guitar/vocals on Ultrapop (2021)
 Chris Slorach - guitar/vocals on Ultrapop (2021)
 Dan Stolarski - guitar/vocals on Ultrapop (2021)
 Johnni Randall - bass/vocals on Ultrapop (2021)
 Cara Drolshagen - vocals on Ultrapop (2021)
 Troy Van Leeuwen - guitar on Ultrapop (2021)

Discography

Full lengths

Live albums

Compilation albums

Extended plays

Singles 
 "Luxury Themes" (2018)
 "Ft. Frank Turner" (2019)
"All Futures" (2021)
"Average Death" (2021)

Music videos

References

External links
 Official website
 
 Official MySpace profile

Metalcore musical groups from Michigan
Hardcore punk groups from Michigan
Musical groups established in 2009
Unidentified musicians
Unidentified people